Dorman Products, Inc. is a manufacturer of aftermarket automotive products in the United States. The company was founded in 1918. The company trades on the NASDAQ under the ticker DORM. The company is headquartered in Colmar, Pennsylvania.

Dorman focuses on identifying parts that are frequently failing on cars, trucks and other motor vehicles in operation and developing repair and replacement products. 

The company announced record sales in 2022. In August 2022, the company began the purchase of SuperATV for $590 million in total value. In June of 2021, Dorman entered an agreement to acquire Dayton Parts for $338 million.

References

External links 
 

Manufacturing companies based in Pennsylvania
Manufacturing companies established in 1918
1918 establishments in Pennsylvania
Auto parts suppliers of the United States